, Temple of Crossing the Blue Shore, is a Tendai Buddhist temple in Wakayama Prefecture, Japan.  In 2004, it was listed as a UNESCO World Heritage Site along with other locations, under the name "Sacred Sites and Pilgrimage Routes in the Kii Mountain Range".  According to a legend, it was founded by the priest Ragyō Shōnin, a monk from India.  The temple was purposely built near Nachi Falls, where it may have previously been a site of nature worship.  Seiganto-ji is part of the Kumano Sanzan shrine complex, and as such can be considered one of the few jingū-ji (shrine temples, see article Shinbutsu shūgō) still in existence after the forcible separation of Shinto and Buddhism operated by the Japanese government during the Meiji restoration.

It is Saigoku Kannon Pilgrimage's No.1 (first stop) and an Important Cultural Properties of Japan.

History 
During the reign of Emperor Nintoku (313 – 399), according to temple legend, Ragyō Shōnin, a monk from India, came here following the river in search of a suitable place in which to practice his austerities and found Nachi waterfall. After practicing shugyō, Kannon appeared to him at the base of the waterfall and so he built a hermitage dedicated to Kannon in this place.

During the reign of Empress Suiko (592 – 628), Shōbutsu Shōnin came here from Yamato in order to undergo austerity practices. At that time he carved a 4 meter high image of Nyoirin Kannon from a single piece of camellia tree. The Hondō (main temple) was built to enshrine this image which became the focus of the Nachi Kannon cult and is the image that is enshrined in the present Nyorindō.

In 988 Emperor Kazan (花山天皇) (968-1008) visited the Kumano area on his first pilgrimage and, being deeply moved by the image of Kannon, he declared this Temple One of the Saigoku Kannon pilgrimage. It is said that Emperor Kazan completed 1000 days of severe spiritual training under the waterfall, after which he had a vision of Kannon in the form of the kami Kumano Gongen. The kami instructed the emperor to find the priest Butsugan of Hasedera (Temple 8 of the pilgrimage), who helped the emperor to remap out the current pilgrimage route.

Emperor Kazan wrote all the goeika poems that are still used throughout the pilgrimage as sacred hymns. It became a custom in later years for other emperors who went on this pilgrimage to also compose poems of their own for each of the sacred sites.

Because Emperor Gotoba (1180-1239; r. 1183–1198) made the pilgrimage to Kumano 31 times and his successor Emperor Go-Shirakawa (1127 – 1192; reigned 1155 – 1158) made it 34 times, the pilgrimage became popular during this era.  However, members of court had been coming here for about 400 years prior to this, believing it was near to Kannon's paradise island located to the south of Japan called Fudaraku (Potala in Sanskrit).

The temple buildings, like many of the temples on the pilgrimage route, were burned to the ground by Oda Nobunaga during the civil wars of the 16th century. The Nyorindō (Main Temple) was rebuilt in 1587 by Toyotomi Hideyoshi, the Imperial Regent who unified Japan after the wars. It is typical of Momoyama Era style of architecture with a shingled distinctive roof called irimoya. The Nyorindō is heritage listed as a nationally Important Cultural Property.

When the government reinstated the power of the Emperor during the Meiji era (1868 - 1912), an attempt was made to separate Buddhist temples and Shinto shrines that had for over a thousand years shared the same grounds. Because of this, Seigantoji was formally abolished, the priests stripped of their authority and no funding was given to the temple. At that time Seigantoji had three main temples as well as 37 residential and training building. But all that remained after the Meiji Restoration was the Nyorindō and the abbot's quarters. However, gradually over the following century it was slowly rebuilt due to its position as an important part of the Kumano-Nachi syncretic mountain veneration religion of Shugendō.

In 1918, a Sutra mound was excavated at the base of the waterfall and found to contain many important archaeological artifacts, including statues, mirrors, altar fittings and Sutra cylinders. These are now displayed in the Ryuhoden (“Treasure Hall”), located next to the Pagoda. These Sutra mounds were created by priests in times of war to hide their treasures but also many items were buried in this way as a result of the belief that the end of the world was coming at the start of the 10th century.

Building and Places of Interest within the temple grounds 
 Daimonsaka Forest Path
 Sanmon (Mountain Gate)
 Kumano Nachi Taisha shrine (heiden)
 Homotsuden Treasure Hall
 Nyoirindō (The Temple of the Wish-fulfilling Kannon), the main temple (Hondō)
 Sanjūdō pagoda (3-storey pagoda)
 Nachi-no-Taki (Nachi Waterfall)
 Nyohōdō (Hall of Lantern)
 Sonsho-in Abbot's Quarters
 Waniguchi "Crocodile Mouth" Gong
 Fudarakusan-ji

Images

See also
Kumano Shrine

Notes

References

Seiganto-ji's official site 
Sacred Japan, History of Seigantoji, accessed on September 23, 2009

Pagodas in Japan
Important Cultural Properties of Japan
Buddhist temples in Wakayama Prefecture
Shinbutsu shūgō
Tendai temples
World Heritage Sites in Japan
Kumano Sanzan